Elijah Strong House is a historic home located at Ashland in Greene County, New York.  It was built about 1797 and is a 2-story, two-by-five-bay timber frame dwelling.  It rests on a stone foundation and has a moderately pitched gable roof.  The interior features a mix of Federal and  Greek Revival style elements.

It was listed on the National Register of Historic Places in 2003.

A copy of the registration record for the Elijah Strong House, including photographs, has been uploaded to the National Archives Catalog online.

See also
National Register of Historic Places listings in Greene County, New York

References

Houses on the National Register of Historic Places in New York (state)
Houses completed in 1797
Federal architecture in New York (state)
Houses in Greene County, New York
National Register of Historic Places in Greene County, New York